Buchmany is an urban-type settlement in Korosten Raion, Zhytomyr Oblast, Ukraine. Population:  In 2001, population was 832.

References

Urban-type settlements in Korosten Raion